Sandwich is the second studio album by American comedy metal band Psychostick, and the follow-up to 2003's We Couldn't Think of a Title. The album, a 24-track opus to food, email spam, bad directions, revenge, and more food, was recorded by guitarist Josh Key at Toxic Recording in Gilbert, Arizona, and features new members Jake McReynolds on second guitar and former Indorphine vocalist Jimmy Grant on bass. Rounding out the band roster are Alex Preiss (drums), and Rob Kersey (vocals). It was released May 5, 2009 (US only) via Rock Ridge Music.

Guitarist Josh Key stated that "we already had most of Sandwich written when we started touring to support our first album, We Couldn't Think of a Title, in 2006." Drummer Alex Preiss stated that "Sandwich is a delicious collection of songs written from 2004-2008, mostly 08." Song titles on Sandwich include "Caffeine," "Minimum Rage," and "#1 Radio $ingle."

The band also recorded, as per their album fundraiser, "373 Thank Yous." 373 represents the number of fans – who are individually thanked in the song itself – who donated $50 or more to help the band pay for studio time and equipment. "373 Thank Yous" has a run-time of 14:19 and has been described as "one of the more tedious tracks on a mostly unfunny comedy-metal album." The song itself is a medley of some songs from their previous albums.

Track listing

Personnel
Psychostick
 Joshua "The J" Key — guitars, vocals
 Jimmy "Jimmychanga" Grant — bass, vocals
 Jake "Jakermeister" McReynolds — guitars, vocals
 Alex "Shmalex" Preiss — drums
 Rob "Rawrb" Kersey — lead vocals
 Guest Appearances:
 Rachel Silverton on "Girl Directions"
 Produced by Psychostick
 Mixed and Engineered by Joshua "The J" Key
 Artwork by Robert "Rawrb" Kersey
 Recorded at Toxic Recording
 Management by Anthony Caroto
 Photos by Robbie Fuct
 Mastered by Dave Shirk at Sonorus Mastering, INC.

Chart performance

References

2009 albums
Psychostick albums
Rock Ridge Music albums